The 2014 Rugby Europe Women's Sevens – Division A was the second level of international women's rugby sevens competitions organised by Rugby Europe for 2014. The competition featured just one tournament, played in Bergen. Scotland won the tournament, and along with runner-up Ukraine, were promoted to the 2015 Grand Prix series.

Pool stages

Group A

Ukraine	 22-0 Norway
Switzerland	 10-24 Romania
Ukraine	 19-5 Romania
Switzerland 27-7 Norway
Romania	26-0 Norway
Ukraine	 38-0 Switzerland

Group B

Scotland 36-0 Finland
Moldova 27-0 Croatia
Scotland 36-0 Croatia
Moldova 5-17 Finland
Croatia	12-7 Finland
Scotland	38-7 Moldova

Group C

Czech Republic	 36-0 Denmark
Poland	5-17 Georgia
Czech Republic 12-7 Georgia
Poland	24-5 Denmark
Georgia	34-0 Denmark
Czech Republic	 10-17 Poland

Knockout stage

Bowl
Semi-finals
Switzerland 36-0 Denmark
Croatia 0-17 Norway
11th/12th Match 
Denmark 32-19 Croatia
Bowl final:9th/10th Match
Switzerland 25-0 Norway

Plate
Semi-finals
Finland 17-0 Czech Republic
Poland 14-17 Moldova
7th/8th Match 
Czech Republic 22-0 Poland
Plate final: 5th/6th Match 
Finland 5-10 Moldova

Cup
Quarter-finals
Scotland 20-10 Finland
Ukraine 22-0 Poland
Georgia 14-10 Moldova
Czech Republic 10-12 Romania
Semi-finals
Scotland 14-7 Romania
Ukraine 34-5 Georgia
3rd/4th place
Romania 12-5 Georgia
Cup Final: 1st/2nd place
Scotland 5-17 Ukraine

2014
A
rugby union
rugby union in Norway
Rugby